Kenneth Casey (1899–1965) was an American composer and child actor.
 
Kenneth, Ken, or Kenny Casey may refer to:
 Ken Casey (born 1969), bass guitarist and frontman of Dropkick Murphys
 Kenneth J. Casey (died 2020), California real estate investor
 Kenneth L. Casey (born 1935), neurologist

See also
 Ken Kesey (1935–2001), American author
 Casey (disambiguation)